Bona is a village in Lena Department, Houet Province, Burkina Faso.

Bona has a population of 690.

See also
 Bona (Safané), Burkina Faso

References

Houet Province
Populated places in the Hauts-Bassins Region